The Greek Ice hockey Championship is the only level of ice hockey in Greece. It is operated under the jurisdiction of the Hellenic Ice Sports Federation, an associate member of the International Ice Hockey Federation. There are currently registered 100 players.

History

Hockey was played no later than from the beginning of the 20th century by Greeks in America, even the modern Greek words for ice hockey ("hockey epi pagou") and skates ("pagopedila") are from an older form of the language, as spoken in the first half of the 20th century. It took until 1984, when ice hockey started in Greece in 1984 by players that returned to Greece from abroad. Soon later five teams were formed, two in Athens, one in Piraeus, one in Salonica and one in Chalkida. The first official game was played in 1985 in Athens.

The first official Greek Championship was held in 1989 in the Peace and Friendship Stadium with five teams taking place. It was the first time hockey games were held in a normal size rink. The following year the Championship was held once again in the Peace and Friendship Stadium.

In 1991, the first junior national team was formed and took part in the World Junior Championship Pool C, held in Belgrade, Yugoslavia. In 1992, the junior national team once again took part in the World Junior Championship Pool C, this time held in Marino and Rome, Italy.

In 1992, the first-ever men's Greek national team was formed and took place in the Men's World Ice Hockey Championships in Pool C2 held in Johannesburg, South Africa. With only two weeks of serious training abroad and the support of the Greeks of South Africa, the national team won the bronze medal. It was extraordinary for a team to win a medal in their first appearance at the World Championships.

Despite the great achievement, the decline of the sport came in 1993. Economic help was discontinued by the Greek Undersecretary of State for Sports and all expenses to keep ice hockey alive were passed over to the players. Practices stopped and many players quit.

Practices started again in 1995 but were limited to once a week. Despite the hard times ice hockey faced, a national team was formed in 1995 and took part in the World Championships held once again in Johannesburg, South Africa (and also Krugersdorp, South Africa). Unfortunately, the problems affected the players and they were unable to defend the bronze medal they had won three years ago. They won one game and tied one in five games.

Although the problems continued to exist, in 1996, the Junior National Team took part in the European Championships. They made one win in five games. In March 1998, the men's national team went to the World Championships held in South Africa. They won one game and, despite all the problems, everyone was amazed at the level of Greek ice hockey.

By early 1999, nothing had changed concerning the funds from the Greek Undersecretary of State for Sports. Despite this, the men's national team took part in the World Championships Pool D held once again in South Africa. The team won one game.

In 2001, the Moschato Ice Rink closed down. Many players stopped playing and others started practicing in the only ice rink left in Greece. An ice rink far too small to be able to hold a serious ice hockey game.

In 2002, the effort was made to rebuild the league, but all efforts fell short.

The only ice rink left in Greece closed down definitely in May 2003.

After the closing of the last ice rink, the players of the national team decided to take trips to the Czech Republic for practices and games. Since that decision, 6 trips have been organized. Every 6 months, the players of the national team pay their own way and travel to the Czech Republic.

For the past 2 years, the national team has been trying to convince the IIHF that despite not having a rink, development of the sport is continuing in Greece. The efforts paid off, since the IIHF, after investigation decided to allow the National Team to compete again in international competition. This was great for Greek ice hockey since the national team competed again in 1999.

In 2006, two ice rinks were built in Greece and the Championship was established again.

Teams
The Greek Ice Hockey Championship consists of 5 teams based in Athens, Thessaloniki and Chalkida

Current teams

Albatros HC
Aris Thessaloniki
Avantes HC
Huskies Thessaloniki
Ice Guardians Thessaloniki
Iptamenoi Pagodromoi Athinai
Iraklis Thessaloníki
Mad Cows
Panserraikos HC
PAOK
Tarandos Athens
Warriors Athens

Format

In the Regular Season, all 7 teams play twice against each other and the top 4 qualify for the Final Four which is held in the Ano Liosia Olympic Hall located in Ano Liosia, Athens.

Champions

* The President of the Greek Federation did not allow Iptamenoi Pagodromoi Athinai participate in the Greek Championship despite the team being active.

** Iptamenoi Pagodromoi Athinai and Albatros Athens did not participate despite both teams being active.

Titles by team

See also
List of ice hockey leagues

References

External links
Ice Hockey in Greece Website
Iptameni Athens Official Website
Ano Liossia Olympic Hall, the Final Four Venue

 
Top tier ice hockey leagues in Europe
Ice
Championship
Ice Hockey